Yang Chunhong (born 24 August 1987) is a Chinese retired goalball player. He won a gold medal at the 2008 Summer Paralympics.

Yang was from the mountains in Luquan Yi and Miao Autonomous County, Yunnan province. He was blinded by a doctor's steroid eyedrops which damaged his cornea when he was in the third year of junior high. Although his family won the medical malpractice lawsuit, it did not receive any compensation because the doctor did not have money. The family had to borrow money to pay for his eye surgery.

References

Male goalball players
1987 births
Living people
Sportspeople from Kunming
People from Luquan Yi and Miao Autonomous County
Paralympic goalball players of China
Paralympic gold medalists for China
Goalball players at the 2008 Summer Paralympics
Medalists at the 2008 Summer Paralympics
Paralympic medalists in goalball